Barbara Hajcel (born 10 December 1971 in Poznań) is a Polish sprint canoer who competed in the mid-1990s. She won two medals at the 1994 ICF Canoe Sprint World Championships in Mexico City with a gold in the K-2 500 m event and a bronze in the K-2 200 m event.

References

1971 births
Living people
Polish female canoeists
Sportspeople from Poznań
ICF Canoe Sprint World Championships medalists in kayak